Sir John Esmonde, 10th Baronet (16 May 1826 – 9 December 1876) was an Irish nationalist politician. He sat in the House of Commons of the United Kingdom from 1852 until his death 25 years later.

Early life and family 
Esmonde was the son of Royal Navy officer James Esmonde and his wife Anna Maria ( Murphy).

He was educated at Clongowes Wood College and at Trinity College Dublin, where he graduated in 1850 with an honours degree in classics.

He was called to the bar of Ireland in the same year.

In 1861 he married Louisa Grattan, the fourth daughter of Henry Grattan MP, and granddaughter of 18th-century parliamentary leader Henry Grattan. They had four sons and two daughters, Thomas, Laurence, Walter, John, Ellice, and Annette.

In 1868, he inherited the baronetcy and estates of his uncle Thomas.

Career 
He was elected at the 1852 general election as one of the two members of parliament (MPs) for County Waterford.
Both Esmonde and his fellow Waterford MP Nicholas Mahon Power were elected as candidates of the Irish Liberal Party, which had been in alliance with nationalists. Power was accused of acting "selfishly and parsimoniously" towards Esmonde,
who was described at the time as hoisting "free trade and liberal colours".
Esmonde's election was the subject of a petition by the defeated Conservative candidate Richard Hely-Hutchinson, who alleged personation and intimidation.
The names of people who were not entitled to vote were struck off the return, but Esmonde's election was upheld.

The alliance of nationalists and liberals faltered after the election, and Esmonde was one of 40 Irish Liberals who transferred their support to the new Independent Irish Party. The new party foundered, and Esmonde was re-elected as a Liberal at the next 4 general elections.

In January 1866, Esmonde was appointed as High Sheriff of Wexford.
On 2 June, he was appointed by as a Junior Lord of the Treasury in the Liberal Government of Earl Russell.
As an office of profit under the Crown, the Parliamentary rules of the time required him to seek re-election, and on 9 June he was returned
unopposed.
However, his time in office was short, because Russell's government fell before the end of June, to be replaced by a Conservative government.

In 1869, he was appointed as a deputy lieutenant of County Wexford, succeeding his uncle Thomas. 
Described by The Times newspaper of London as a "zealous and attached member of the Roman Catholic communion",
Esmonde was listed in 1869 as one of 50 Catholic baronets, and 38 Catholic MPs.
He was one of the speakers at a rally in Dublin in November 1870 to protest at the loss of the temporal power of the Pope.

At the 1874 general election, he was returned again for Waterford,
this time as a candidate of the newly reconstituted Home Rule Party. He died in office two years later, aged 50. Esmonde had also been a justice of the peace for counties Waterford, Wexford, and Wicklow, a captain in the Wexford militia, and a member of the Royal Irish Academy.

His parliamentary seat was won at the resulting by-election by the Home Rule candidate James Delahunty, and he was succeeded in the baronetcy by his son Thomas.

See also 
 Esmonde baronets

References

External links 
 
 
 

1826 births
1876 deaths
John
Baronets in the Baronetage of Ireland
Members of the Parliament of the United Kingdom for County Waterford constituencies (1801–1922)
Members of the Royal Irish Academy
Irish Liberal Party MPs
Irish Parliamentary Party MPs
UK MPs 1852–1857
UK MPs 1857–1859
UK MPs 1859–1865
UK MPs 1865–1868
UK MPs 1868–1874
UK MPs 1874–1880
People educated at Clongowes Wood College
Alumni of Trinity College Dublin
High Sheriffs of Wexford
Deputy Lieutenants of Wexford